James Hamilton may refer to:

Dukes
James Hamilton, 1st Duke of Hamilton (1606–1649), heir to the throne of Scotland
James Hamilton, 4th Duke of Hamilton (1658–1712), Scottish nobleman
James Hamilton, 5th Duke of Hamilton (1703–1743), Scottish nobleman
James Hamilton, 6th Duke of Hamilton (1724–1758), Scottish nobleman
James Hamilton, 7th Duke of Hamilton (1755–1769), Scottish nobleman
James Hamilton, 1st Duke of Abercorn (1811–1885), twice served as Lord Lieutenant of Ireland
James Hamilton, 2nd Duke of Abercorn (1838–1913), British nobleman and diplomat
James Hamilton, 3rd Duke of Abercorn (1869–1953), first Governor of Northern Ireland
James Hamilton, 4th Duke of Abercorn (1904–1979), Northern Irish senator
James Hamilton, 5th Duke of Abercorn (born 1934), Northern Irish politician

Marquesses
James Hamilton, 2nd Marquess of Hamilton (1589–1625), 4th Earl of Arran, Scottish nobleman

Earls
James Hamilton, 1st Earl of Arran (c. 1475–1529), Scottish nobleman
James Hamilton, Duke of Châtellerault (c. 1516–1575), and 2nd Earl of Arran, Scottish nobleman
James Hamilton, 3rd Earl of Arran (c. 1537–1609), Scottish nobleman
James Hamilton, 1st Earl of Abercorn (c. 1575–1618), Sheriff of Linlithgow
James Hamilton, 2nd Earl of Abercorn (c. 1604–c. 1670), Scottish nobleman
James Hamilton, 6th Earl of Abercorn (c. 1661–1734), Scottish and Irish nobleman
James Hamilton, 7th Earl of Abercorn (1686–1744), Scottish nobleman and amateur scientist
James Hamilton, 8th Earl of Abercorn (1712–1789), Scottish and Irish nobleman
James Hamilton, 1st Earl of Clanbrassil (first creation) (died 1659), Anglo-Irish Royalist peer, soldier and politician
James Hamilton, 1st Earl of Clanbrassil (second creation) (1694–1758), British politician
James Hamilton, 2nd Earl of Clanbrassil (1730–1798), Irish peer

Viscounts
James Hamilton, 1st Viscount Claneboye (1560–1644), Ulster Scot land owner and settler
James Hamilton, Viscount Hamilton (1786–1814), British politician

Barons and other nobles
Sir James Hamilton of Cadzow (before 1397–c. 1440), 5th Laird of Cadzow
James Hamilton, 1st Lord Hamilton (1415–1479), Scottish nobleman
Sir James Hamilton of Finnart (died 1540), military engineer, illegitimate son of the 1st earl and guardian to the 2nd
James Hamilton, 3rd Baron Hamilton of Strabane (1633–1655), Irish nobleman
James Hamilton, Lord Paisley (died before 1670), eldest son of James Hamilton, 2nd Earl of Abercorn
James Hamilton, 4th Baron Hamilton of Dalzell (1938–2006), British politician
James Douglas-Hamilton, Baron Selkirk of Douglas (born 1942), member of the Scottish Parliament

Arts and entertainment
 James Hamilton (painter) (1819–1878), American painter; see Edward Moran
 James Whitelaw Hamilton (1860–1932), Scottish artist
 Neil Hamilton (actor) (James Neil Hamilton, 1899–1984), American actor
 Jimmy Hamilton (1917–1994), American jazz musician
 James Hamilton (photographer), American photographer
 James Alexander Hamilton (music writer) (1785–1845), English compiler of musical instruction books
 James G. C. Hamilton, American sculptor
 James Hamilton (DJ and journalist) (1942–1996), British DJ and journalist for Record Mirror and Music Week

Clergy
James Hamilton (bishop of Argyll) (died 1580), Scottish prelate
James Hamilton (minister, born 1600) (1600–1666), Scottish minister, active in Ireland
James Hamilton (bishop of Galloway) (1610–1674), Scottish prelate
James Hamilton (Archdeacon of Raphoe) (1636–1689), Irish Anglican priest
James Hamilton (priest) (1748–1815), Irish priest and astronomer
James Hamilton (minister, born 1814) (1814–1867), Scottish minister and author, primarily in London

Military
 James Hamilton (English army officer) (c. 1620–1673), Irish courtier and soldier, during the reign of Charles II of England
 James Inglis Hamilton (died 1803), general in the British Army
 James Hamilton (British Army officer, born 1777) (1777–1815), British army colonel
 Sir John Hamilton, 1st Baronet, of Woodbrook (1755-1835), Irish-born general who served in the British East India Company and the Portuguese Army

Politics
 James Hamilton (Pennsylvania politician) (1710–1783), mayor of Philadelphia and lieutenant-governor of Pennsylvania
 James Hamilton Jr. (1786–1857), Governor and Representative for South Carolina
 James Alexander Hamilton (1788–1878), acting U.S. Secretary of State under President Andrew Jackson
 James Hans Hamilton (1810–1863), Anglo-Irish Member of Parliament
 James Kent Hamilton (1839–1918), mayor of Toledo, Ohio
 James A. Hamilton (1876–1950), Secretary of State of New York 1923–1924
 James Hamilton (Scottish politician) (1918–2005), Scottish politician
 James Hamilton (barrister) (born 1949), Director of Public Prosecutions in Ireland
 James E. Hamilton (born 1935), American former politician in the state of Oklahoma
 Sir James Hamilton, 2nd Baronet (1682–1750), Member of Parliament for Clydesdale

Sports
James Hamilton (American football) (born 1974), American football player
James Hamilton (cricketer) (1843–1881), Australian cricketer
James Hamilton (football forward) (fl. 1892–1893), Scottish football (soccer) player for Queen's Park and the national team
James Hamilton (footballer, born 1884) (1884–?), English football (soccer) player
James Hamilton (footballer, born 1901) (1901–1975), Scottish football (soccer) player for St Mirren, Rangers, Blackpool and the national team
James Hamilton (footballer, born 1904), English footballer for Crystal Palace
James Hamilton (footballer, born 1906), Scottish footballer for Carlisle United and Rochdale
James Hamilton (footballer, born 1955), Scottish footballer for Sunderland and Carlisle United
James Hamilton (snowboarder) (born 1989), New Zealand Olympic snowboarder
Jimmy Hamilton (curler), 1963 World Curling Championships known as the Scotch Cup

Other people
 James Alexander Greer Hamilton (1854–1925), principal surgeon at North Adelaide Hospital, South Australia
 James Hamilton (assassin) (died 1581), assassin
 James Hamilton (barrister) (born 1949), Irish barrister and administrator 
 James Hamilton (physician) (1767–1839), Scottish physician
 James Hamilton (language teacher) (1769–1829), Irish proponent of the "Hamiltonian system" for teaching languages
 James M. Hamilton (1861–1940), third president of Montana State University, 1904–1919
 James Stevenson-Hamilton (1867–1957), founder of the Kruger National Park, South Africa
 Jamie Hamilton (publisher) (1900–1988), Scottish-American book publisher and champion oarsman
 James Hamilton (physicist) (1918–2000), Irish mathematician and theoretical physicist
 James D. Hamilton (born 1954), econometrician
 Sir James Arnot Hamilton (1923–2012), British aerospace engineer

See also
 Jamie Hamilton (disambiguation)
 Jim Hamilton (disambiguation)
 Jimmy Hamilton (disambiguation)
 Hamish Hamilton, a former British book publishing house (Gaelic version of the name James Hamilton)